Sheffield Rugby Union Football Club is a rugby union club based at Abbeydale Sports Club in Sheffield, South Yorkshire, England. The club plays in National League 2 North, at the fourth level of the English rugby union system, following promotion from Midlands Premier at the end of the 2021–22 season.

Current standings

History
Records show that rugby football was being played in the City of Sheffield  as long ago as the early 1860s indeed four Sheffield players represented Yorkshire in the first ever recorded county match against Lancashire in 1869. Officially Sheffield Rugby Union Football Club was founded in 1902 and subsequently found a permanent home at Abbeydale Park, Dore in 1920 where it has three senior pitches.

Over the years Sheffield RUFC has enjoyed mixed fortunes, existing as it does, in a city focussed primarily upon soccer, but arguably its most successful seasons were in the late 1970s into the early years of the centennial that heralded the advent of the professional era. During this time the club was proud to be numbered within the vanguard of senior clubs playing at the highest level, initially as a member of the Northern Merit Tables and ultimately the National Leagues.

Sheffield RUFC has a tremendous historical record and Corinthian tradition in promoting the sport of rugby union at all levels establishing a thriving youth section following the Second World War and is able to boast one of the first ‘colts’ teams in Yorkshire.

The onset of the professional era and the demise of school sport within the city led to a decline in the fortunes of the first team and subsequently demotion from National League status in 2004.

Early years
The first match to be played on the new ground was a loss against Leicester Westleigh. The rest of the season proved to be more fruitful. 1952 saw the 50th anniversary of the club and the Golden Jubilee with matches against a Yorkshire XV and Plymouth Albion to celebrate; Sheffield winning both.

1970s
It was the 1970s that saw Rugby Union change quite dramatically and with it Sheffield RUFC. The change from friendlies to a competitive structure was the forerunner to the League system. The 1970s were to be halcyon years seeing such players as Alan Old, the emergence of the flair of Bill Reichwald and Michael Stuart. More talent in Brian Firth, George Kirkpatrick, Steve Newsome, Mike Gange, Chris Sharpe and John Cowell to name a few, playing for the club and winning both county and national honours. Sheffield also qualified for the Northern Merit Table, playing the North's elite clubs.

1980s
The 1980s saw a great deal of re-building after retirements and players moving away from Sheffield but home grown talent continued to flourish. Great talent such as Miles Pierce, Michael Stuart, David Holmes, Robin Goodliffe, Nick Crapper and Simon Mugford graced the field. 1981 saw a memorable highlight in the trip of Sheffield RUFC to play Swansea at St Helens ground, with nine internationals in their side. This year also saw the Sheffield side to the final of the Yorkshire Cup, narrowly losing to old enemy Wakefield 23–3.

1990s
The 1990s saw Sheffield captained still by Bill Reichwald and including some great talent; Doncaster trio Dave (The Badger) Bosworth, Andy Gough and Alistair Challoner and Kerry Morley, Dave Fairclough, Ian Wright, Dave Watson and Rob Parr, amongst others and playing the likes of Nuneaton, Lydney, Redruth, Sale and Askeans as well as all of our Yorkshire rival clubs and the odd friendly against up and coming sides such as Wharfedale and Rotherham. This decade also saw the changing face of Sheffield Rugby as the both pitch and stand were to be rebuilt to the excellent standard you witness today.

Club awards
Always seeking to be at the forefront of developing and being in line with RFU guidance the club achieved the RFU Seal of Approval back in October 2007.

The clubs history, stakes a firm commitment to the true values of rugby union, and these have also been seen through recent awards, of being the first club in Yorkshire, to receive the Referees ‘Fair Play & Pleasure to Referee’ awards to both the senior and youth sections, in season 2011–12.

More recently the club has been awarded two National ‘President XV awards for its efforts in both  coaching, and player retention, in season 2012–13.

Colours
Home: the traditional colours are a royal blue and white hoops shirt, navy blue shorts and red socks with white and blue hoops. For the 2019/2020 season Sheffield will be wearing light blue and navy blue hoops, with navy blue shorts and plain red socks to celebrate the centenary of playing at Abbeydale Park.

Away: red shirt with navy blue shorts and red socks with white and blue hoops.

Men's seniors 
Sheffield RUFC currently have four senior teams and a sevens team.

Respective leagues
 the 1st XV play in Midlands Premier
 the Development XV play in Yorkshire Merit Premiership
 the 3rd XV play in Western Championship
 the 4th XV play in South District Merit Table
During the off season Sheffield enter several sevens competitions, with 1st XV, Development and 3rd XV players and guests normally making up the teams.

There are thriving junior and mini sections within the club and also a ladies section, which includes the senior women, who play in RFUW Championship North 2

Season 2012–13
 The 1st XV played in North East One and were unlucky not to get a play-off spot this season 2012–13, and have improved their position in all of the last three seasons.
 the 2nd XV played their first season in the Yorkshire Merit League Premiership ( finishing 3rd ) after gaining promotion the year before.
 the 3rd XV had a strong season and showed the strength in depth of Sheffield Rugby Club by winning the South District League 2, and gaining promotion. There was a re-structuring of the leagues in season 2013–14, so the 3rd team while being promoted, played in the newly formed,  Western Championship. ( which is one league below the 2nd team)
 the 4th team, has traditionally been a ‘fun’ team, playing occasional games, generally for the ‘older’ players who simply just want to turn out and play. They play in the South District Merit league 1.

Sheffield Ladies
Sheffield Ladies RUFC was established in 1996 and has gone from strength to strength in the intervening years successfully competing within the National Leagues providing numerous County representative players as well as a recent England International player. Excellent links have been forged with the two highly regarded Sheffield Universities and this has encouraged players of all abilities to flourish in any aspect and at any level of rugby they wish including obtaining coaching and refereeing qualifications.

Sheffield Ladies have competed in North 2 for many years always finishing in the top part of the table, finishing 2nd in season 2012–13, and having only lost 1 game all season.  Sheffield has supported Emily Braun in her early days before she gained her first England caps in the 6 nations in 2010. Sheffield Ladies has had many girls represent Yorkshire with Charlotte Evans captaining them for 2 years, Charlotte has also represented North of England for 3 years and has been an England trials.  Sheffield Ladies is a section which helps girls develop in any aspect of rugby they wish. They have good links with the Sheffield Hallam and Sheffield University ladies by giving players the opportunity to train and potentially play for Yorkshire County and Divisional sides. We also aim to help interested players gain their rugby coaching and refereeing qualifications. In season 2012–13 Andrea Dobson, was capped for the National side at Rugby League.

Coaching
A professional approach to coaching and education is maintained with over sixty-five Rugby Ready and over 60 coaches qualified to RFU Levels 1 or 2

Age Grade
The ‘Age Grade’ ( previously Mini & Junior ) Rugby Section, was established in the mid 1940s and boasted one of the first Colts (U19’s) teams in Yorkshire. Slowly over the years the club has expanded and developed its membership base in its Mini (U7-U12), Junior (U13-U16), &Colts (U17’s and U19’s). The steady growth has ensured that Sheffield have fielded a side in every Age since the mid 1980s, and this was further helped and maintained following the momentum of England’s World Cup win in 2003, this influx is expected again come the World Cup in England in 2015. From 2003 through to 2013, the playing membership has grown from 125, to now over 350 Children. (The largest Age grade section, in the North of England.) Regularly Sheffield provides at least 3 to 4 Semi-Finalists, and nearly always at least 1 winning side in the prestigious Yorkshire Cup, competitions. Over the past 10 years, 9 of the Senior Colts sides have competed very well in the Premier league, and nearly always finishing in the top 4.

The Mini and Junior Section of the Rugby Club has witnessed considerable success for over the past thirty years. Indeed, there are over three hundred and fifty boys and girls from across the full spectrum of the city registered with the section and this represents the largest age-grade section in the North of England.

Many of the young players have achieved representative honours and during the last season over thirty players were selected to represent their district (South Yorkshire ) and above ( County ). Embracing the diversity agenda, Sheffield RUFC is committed to continuing and improving its Mini and Junior Section and will continue to see home nurtured players progress into representation within the four senior teams and hopefully beyond.

Juniors and Minis
Sheffield RUFC provide rugby union at every level.

Boys
SRUFC have a boys team at every level from under 7s to under 17s. Many of the boys go on to represent county and above at their respective age groups. Once junior level has finished most will move on to the Colts or one of the senior teams.

Club records list

Most wins in a season 30 / 1969–70

Most points in a season 995 / 2002–03

Most tries in a season 140 / 2002–03

Most points in a game 92 v Scarborough 2002–03

Most points against in a game 83 v Coventry 1997–98

Biggest win 92–5 v Scarborough 2002–03

Biggest defeat 0–66 v Headlingley 1922–23

Longest winning run 19 games / 1965–66

Longest losing run 17 games / 2004–05

Ground

Sheffield RUFC are based at Abbeydale Park in Dore, a village that forms part of the southern suburbs of Sheffield. Positioned on the outskirts of the city, the ground benefits from good transport links and the Dore and Totley railway station is a few minutes walk away. The club has been based at Abbeydale Park since 1919, having previously played at grounds in Sandygate and Tinsley.

The ground is part of a greater sports complex which has facilities for cricket, hockey, tennis, and a multitude of other sports as well as rugby union. Facilities at the rugby ground include a large club-house and bar, several pitches including a main pitch with grand-stand, while excellent flood-lights enable matches to be played throughout the winter months. There is a choice of two car parks at the complex, although it can get very full during the season.

In terms of capacity, the rugby ground has space for around 3,200 spectators, including 224 seated in the stand. The ground was host to Rotherham Titans semi-final play-off games in the RFU Championship in 2014 and 2015 and saw attendances of 3,267 and 3,227 respectively. In recent years Sheffield achieved a attendance of 1,820 against city rivals Sheffield Tigers in their National League 2 North game on 23 December 2017.

Honours
 North 1 (east v west) promotion play-off winners (2): 2002–03, 2014–15
 Durham/Northumberland 1 v Yorkshire 1 promotion play-off winners: 2010–11
 National League 3 (north v midlands) promotion play-off winner: 2016–17

References

English rugby union teams
Rugby clubs established in 1902
Abbeydale
Sport in Sheffield